Michael Peck may refer to:

 Michael Peck (cricketer) (born 1967), former English cricketer
 Michael Peck (priest) (1914–1968), Dean of Lincoln, 1965–1968
 Mick Peck (born 1981), New Zealand magician
 Michael Peck (footballer) (born 2001), English association footballer